Bianca is a 1980 Argentine telenovela starring Amelia Bence, Dora Baret, Víctor Hugo Vieyra and Arturo Bonín.

References

Argentine telenovelas
1980 telenovelas
Televisión Pública original programming
Spanish-language telenovelas